Gurmukh Singh,  was a Sikh soldier from the village Gadram Badi of Ropar in district Ambala of the province of Punjab in British India. Saini won the Indian Order of Merit 1st Class during the First World War for splendid courage on the battlefield on the night of 1 March 1916. He was also awarded Imperial Russia's highest exclusively military award for gallantry in the face of enemy, the Cross of St. George. According to the January 1919 Indian Army List Gurmukh Singh enlisted 19 March 1904 and was a Naik in the 3rd Sappers and Miners when on the 2 March 1916 he was awarded the IOM 1st class. He was later awarded The Cross of St. George, 3rd class according to Honours and awards, Indian Army 1914–21. He was commissioned Jemadar 1 September 1917, and was still serving in 1923 according to the April 1923 Indian Army List.

Award of the Indian Order of Merit: Lieutenant-Governor's Citation
Gurmukh Singh Saini won the Indian Order of Merit, 1st Class for his gallantry during the First World War. He held the rank of jemadar. Sir Michael O'Dwyer, Lieutenant-Governor of the Punjab in British India, read the following citation in his speech regarding Gurmukh Singh's "splendid courage" and "heroism" on the battlefield:

See also
Subedar Joginder Singh Sahnan – PVC winner
Gurbachan Singh Salaria – PVC Winner

References

History of Sikhism
Indian Army personnel of World War I
People from Ambala district
Recipients of the Cross of St. George
Recipients of the Indian Order of Merit
Sikh warriors